La Vie est Belle (Life is Beautiful) may refer to:

 La Vie est Belle (1956 film), a French film by Roger Pierre
 La Vie est Belle (1987 film), a Zairean (Congolese) film starring Congolese singer Papa Wemba
Life Is Beautiful (1997 film), Italian title La vita è bella, an Italian film by Roberto Benigni
 "La Vie est Belle", a track on the album Mach 6 by MC Solaar

See also
 Belle vie (disambiguation)
 Life Is Beautiful (disambiguation)
 La vita è bella (disambiguation)